The 1968–69 Kentucky Colonels season was the second season of the Colonels in the American Basketball Association. Penny Ann Early became the first female player in the history of professional basketball, playing very briefly on November 27, 1968.

In the Eastern Division Semifinals, they lost to the Indiana Pacers 4 games to 3.

Roster
 -- Henry Akin - Power forward
 25 Dan Anderson - Center
 24 Jim Caldwell - Center
 35 Darel Carrier - Shooting guard
 40 Wayne Chapman - Small forward
 10 Louie Dampier - Point guard
 42 Ollie Darden - Power forward
 3  Penny Early - Point guard
 14 Johnny Jones - Small forward
 44 Reggie Lacefield - Point guard/Forward
 42 Manny Leaks - Center
 22 Goose Ligon - Power forward
 34 Paul Long - Shooting guard
 25 Randolph Mahaffey - Power forward
 25 Elton McGriff - Center
 54 Gene Moore - Center
 45 Bobby Rascoe - Shooting guard
 52 Sam Smith - Small forward

Final standings

Eastern Division

Playoffs
Eastern Division Semifinals

Colonels lose series, 4–3

Awards and honors
1969 ABA All-Star Game selections (game played on January 28, 1969 in Louisville, Kentucky)
 Louie Dampier
 Darel Carrier
 Goose Ligon
Gene Rhodes was selected to coach the Eastern Conference

All-ABA Second Team selection
 Louie Dampier

References

 Colonels on Basketball Reference

External links
 RememberTheABA.com 1968-69 regular season and playoff results
 RememberTheABA.com Kentucky Colonels page

Kentucky Colonels seasons
Kentucky
Kentucky Colonels, 1968-69
Kentucky Colonels, 1968-69